Karine Chemla (born in Tunis February 8, 1957) is a French historian of mathematics and sinologist who works as a director of research at the Centre national de la recherche scientifique (CNRS). She is also a senior fellow at the New York University Institute for the Study of the Ancient World. She was elected a Member of the American Philosophical Society in 2019.

Education
Chemla studied at Paris Diderot University and the École normale supérieure de jeunes filles, earning an agrégation in mathematics in 1978 and a diploma of advanced studies in 1979. At this time, her work was in pure mathematics. However, in 1980, influenced by the work of Ilya Prigogine, she won a Singer–Polignac scholarship to travel to China and study the history of Chinese mathematics. Returning to France, she earned her Ph.D. in the history of mathematics from Paris 13 University in 1982, and began working for CNRS at that time.

Contributions
Chemla's research interests include Chinese mathematics, 19th century French geometry, and the theory of the history of mathematics.

With Guo Shuchun, Chemla published in 2004 a critical edition and translation into French of The Nine Chapters on the Mathematical Art. She is also the co-editor, with Cécile Michel, of Mathematics, Administrative and Economic Activities in Ancient Worlds (Springer, 2020).

Recognition
Chemla was an invited speaker at the International Congress of Mathematicians in 1998.
She became a member of the Academy of Sciences Leopoldina in 2004, of the International Academy of the History of Science in 2005, and of the Academia Europaea in 2013. In 2013–2014 she was the holder of the Sarton Chair of History of Science at Ghent University. She is the 2020 winner of the Otto Neugebauer Prize.

References

1958 births
Living people
20th-century French historians
French historians of mathematics
French sinologists
Members of Academia Europaea
Members of the American Philosophical Society
21st-century French historians
Research directors of the French National Centre for Scientific Research